The 2017 Atlantic 10 Conference women's soccer tournament was the postseason women's soccer tournament for the Atlantic 10 Conference held from October 28 through November 5, 2017. The quarterfinals of the tournament were held at campus sites, while the semifinals and final took place at Sports Backers Stadium in Richmond, Virginia. The eight-team single-elimination tournament consisted of three rounds based on seeding from regular season conference play. The defending tournament champions were the Dayton Flyers, but they were eliminated from the 2017 tournament with a 3–2 quarterfinal loss to the La Salle Explorers. La Salle won the tournament, their third Atlantic 10 tournament championship in program history, all of which have come under the direction of head coach Paul Royal, and all three of which were decided in overtime periods.

Megan Dell, who finished the regular season for VCU with two goals, had all three of VCU's goals in the tournament, helping the host team advance to its second A10 final.

Maci Bower's decisive goal in the final, assisted by her sister Madison Bower, was in the ESPN SCTop10 plays of the day nationwide. It was Maci Bower's seventh game winner out of ten goals for the season.

Bracket

Schedule

Quarterfinals

Semifinals

Final

Statistics

Goalscorers 

 3 Goals
 Megan Dell - VCU

2 Goals
 Maci Bower - La Salle

1 Goal
 Madison Bower - La Salle
 Olivia Di Cristofaro - Duquesne 
 Kristin Haugstad - La Salle
 Katherine Hennessey  - La Salle
 Alexis Kiehl - Dayton
 Kaitlynn Kiehl - Dayton
 Shannon Lee - George Mason
 Katie O'Connor - Duquesne
 Olivia Petit - Saint Joseph's
 Jess Shanahan - La Salle

See also 
 2017 Atlantic 10 Men's Soccer Tournament

References 

 
Atlantic 10 Conference Women's Soccer Tournament